[My Life & Me] is a German sitcom produced by Sony Pictures in association with RTL Television. Original ran was from September 14, 2001 to  December 20, 2009. The series focuses on the life of misanthropic student Alex Degenhardt (Wolke Hegenbarth), who deals with everyday life and her sometimes frustrating friends, Claudia (Nora Binder) and Niko (Sebastian Kroehnert), as well as her family: her little brother Basti (Frederik Hunschede) and her hippie parents Hendrik (Gottfried Vollmer) and Anke (Maren Kroymann). A sixth season was produced in 2006 but not shown until late 2009.

References

External links
 

German comedy television series
RTL (German TV channel) original programming
2001 German television series debuts
2009 German television series endings
Television shows set in Cologne
German-language television shows